The 2008 Quadrangular Twenty20 Series in Canada was a tournament of Twenty20 international cricket matches that was held in Canada from 10 to 13 October 2008. The four participating teams are Canada, Pakistan, Sri Lanka and Zimbabwe. The matches were played at the North-West ground of Maple Leaf Cricket Club in King City, Ontario. Sri Lanka defeated Pakistan by five wickets in the final.

Squads

Group stage

Points table

Matches

Third place playoff

Final

References

External links
 Tournament home at ESPN Cricinfo

International cricket competitions in 2008
Quadrangular Twenty20 Series in Canada, 2008
Canadian cricket in the 21st century
2008 in Ontario
Sport in King, Ontario